Osaka's Luna Park (Runa pāku, also known as Shinsekai Luna Park) was Japan's second amusement park of the same name, replacing the destroyed Luna Park in Tokyo. In operation from 1912 to 1923, the 132,000 square meter park in the Shinsekai section of Osaka featured a unique entrance: an aerial tramway from the original Tsutenkaku Tower.

History

The park was constructed and owned by Ken'ichi Kawaura after he sold his interest in the Japanese motion picture company Yoshizawa Shōten to Shōkichi Umeya in the wake of the destruction by fire of Luna Park, Tokyo and two Osaka theaters in 1911. Prior to the suspicious fires, all three were owned by the film studio.

Rather than rebuilding in Tokyo, Kawaura decided to build his second Luna Park in Shinsekai ("New World"), an Osaka subdivision that was under construction at the time. At the same time, the original Tsutenkaku Tower was being built in nearby Tsutenkaku to the north. Plans were being made to connect the  tower to the park by an aerial tramway to provide visitors a unique "flying sensation" as they entered the park.

The Osaka Luna Park featured an arcade, mechanical rides (including one called the Circular Wave, which had seated riders rise and fall as the revolve in a circular motion), a funhouse, a music hall, a theater, and a hot springs spa.

The Osaka Luna Park closed permanently after the 1925 season; in January 1943, the first Tsutenkaku Tower was destroyed by a fire and was subsequently closed and demolished by the Japanese government. A new Tsutenkaku Tower was built and opened to the public in 1956.

Gallery

References

Defunct amusement parks in Japan
Buildings and structures in Osaka
Amusement parks closed in 1923
Amusement parks opened in 1912
1912 establishments in Japan
1923 disestablishments in Japan